Neural circuit reconstruction is the reconstruction of the detailed circuitry of the nervous system (or a portion of the nervous system) of an animal.  It is sometimes called EM reconstruction since the main method used is the electron microscope (EM).  This field is a close relative of reverse engineering of human-made devices, and is part of the field of connectomics, which in turn is a sub-field of neuroanatomy.

Model systems
Some of the model systems used for circuit reconstruction are the fruit fly, the mouse, and the nematode C. elegans.

Sample preparation
The sample must be fixed, stained, and embedded in plastic.

Imaging
The sample may be cut into thin slices with a microtome, then imaged using transmission electron microscopy.  Alternatively, the sample may be imaged with a scanning electron microscope, then the surface abraded using a focused ion beam, or trimmed using an in-microscope microtome. Then the sample is re-imaged, and the process repeated until the desired volume is processed.

Image processing
The first step is to align the individual images into a coherent three dimensional volume.

The volume is then annotated using one of two main methods.  The first manually identifies the skeletons of each neurite.  The second techniques uses computer vision software to identify voxels belonging to the same neuron, which are then corrected in the process of proofreading.

Notable examples
The connectome of C. elegans was the seminal work in this field.  This circuit was obtained with great effort using manually cut sections and purely manual annotation on photographic film.  For many years this was the only circuit reconstruction available.

The central brain of the fruit fly Drosophila Melanogaster was released in 2020.  This data release introduced the first on-line tools to query the connectome.

Querying the connectome
Connectomes of higher organism's brains requires considerable data.  For the fruit fly, for example, roughly 10 terabytes of image data are processed, by humans and computers, to generate several gigabyte of connectome data.  Easy interaction with this data requires an interactive query interface, where researchers can look at the portion of data they are interested in without downloading the whole data set, and without specific training.  A specific example of this technology is the NeuPrint interface to the connectomes generate at HHMI.  This mimics the infrastructure of genetics, where interactive query tools such as BLAST are normally used to look at genes of interest, which for most research comprise only a small portion of the genome.

Limitations and future work
Understanding the detailed operation of the reconstructed networks also requires knowledge of gap junctions (hard to see with existing techniques), the identity of neurotransmitters and the locations and identities of receptors.  In addition, neuromodulators can diffuse across large distances and still strongly affect function.  Currently these features must be obtained through other techniques.  Expansion microscopy may provide an alternative method.

References

Brain
Emerging technologies
Neural coding
Neuroimaging
Neuroinformatics